Boca F.C. is a former Belizean football team that competed in the Belize Premier Football League (BPFL) of the Football Federation of Belize.

The team was based in Independence Village.  Their home stadium was Michael Ashcroft Stadium. They have gone on to play internationally against Olimpia of Honduras and Alianza of El Salvador. The former manager of the team was Marco Chan. The team was sponsored by Strickland Co. Ltd.

Achievements
Belize Premier League: 1 
 2003/04

Football clubs in Belize